James January Winans (June 7, 1818 – April 28, 1879) was an American lawyer and politician who served one term as a U.S. Representative from Ohio from 1869 to 1871.

Biography 
Born in Maysville, Kentucky, Winans moved with his parents to Greene County, Ohio.
He attended the common schools and Transylvania University of Lexington, Kentucky.
He studied law.
He was admitted to the bar in Lexington, Kentucky, in 1841 and commenced practice in Indiana.
He moved to Xenia, Ohio, in 1843 and continued the practice of law.
He served as clerk of the Greene County Courts 1845-1851.
He served in the State senate in 1857.
He served as judge of the court of common pleas 1864-1871.

Winans was elected as a Republican to the Forty-first Congress (March 4, 1869 – March 3, 1871).
He was an unsuccessful candidate for reelection in 1870 to the Forty-second Congress.
He resumed the practice of law.
He died in Xenia, Ohio, April 28, 1879.
He was interred in Woodlawn Cemetery.

Sources

1818 births
1879 deaths
Politicians from Xenia, Ohio
Republican Party Ohio state senators
Ohio lawyers
Transylvania University alumni
19th-century American politicians
19th-century American lawyers
Republican Party members of the United States House of Representatives from Ohio